Upstairs at The Gatehouse is a small pub theatre in Highgate in the London Borough of Camden.

The venue is a refurbished 1895 auditorium, upstairs from the Gatehouse pub, which has served over the years as a music hall, cinema, Masonic lodge, and a jazz and folk music club that once hosted a performance by Paul Simon. Today, the venue hosts theatrical and cabaret productions. It has presented a mix of off-beat and mainstream shows, including an all-female version of Hamlet, modernistic interpretation of opera classics and new musicals and dramas.

Upstairs at the Gatehouse was created by Ovation Theatres Limited (directors John and Katie Plews). The company has owned the theatre since 1997. The Gatehouse pub is owned and operated by Urban Pubs.

Ovation Productions presents a Winter Musical each year at Upstairs at The Gatehouse. In December–January 2017-18 they staged a sellout run of Top Hat which won best choreography in the 2018 Offies Awards. This was followed in December–January 2018-19 by Nice Work If You Can Get It, which was nominated for best Director, Choreography and Musical Director in the 2019 Offies Awards. In 2019-20 they presented a sell out run of 42nd Street which received 5 star reviews from Camden New Journal.

TimeOut described it in 2010 as "one of London's most reliable fringe musical theatre venues".

References

External links
 Upstairs at The Gatehouse
 Ovation Theatres Ltd

Pub theatres in London
Theatres in the London Borough of Camden